State leaders in the 20th century BC – State leaders by year
This is a list of state leaders in the 4th and 3rd millennium BC (4000–2001 BC).

Africa: Northeast

Lower Egypt

Upper Egypt

Egypt united: Old Kingdom

First Intermediate Period of Egypt

Egypt reunited: Middle Kingdom 

Eleventh Dynasty of Middle Kingdom Egypt (complete list) –
Mentuhotep I, King (c.2135 BC)
Intef I, King (c.2120 BC or c.2070 BC)
Intef II, King (2112–2063 BC)
Intef III, King (2069–2061 BC, 2063–2055 BC, or 2016–2009 BC)
Mentuhotep II, King (c.2061–2010 BC)
Mentuhotep III, King (2010 BC – 1998 BC)

Asia: West

Assyria 

Kings who Lived in Tents

Kings whose Fathers Are Known

Kings whose Eponyms Are not Known

Elam

References

Footnotes

Literature 

 Dodson, Aidan and Hilton, Dyan. The Complete Royal Families of Ancient Egypt. Thames & Hudson. 2004. 

State leaders
State leaders
-0000